In the mid-1980s, Iran became interested in unmanned aerial vehicles (UAVs). Iranians have since began manufacturing (UAVs). As an attack munition rather than intelligence, surveillance, or reconnaissance (ISR) platform, the first generation Ababil appears to have been deployed during the Iran–Iraq War.

History
Iran first began using UAVs in 1985, with the Ababil-1 and Mohajer-1, which spied on Iraqi positions behind front-line trenches. In 1988, following Operation Praying Mantis where the US Navy inflicted heavy loses on Iran’s air and navy forces, Iranian strategists realized they could not openly face the US by water. It was then that Iran started investing heavily in drones. The Iranian government has since been open about its interest in UAVs. The Islamic Revolutionary Guard Corps Aerospace Force is the primary operator of Iran’s growing fleet of UAVs, although most Iranian military services employ them.

Major General Bagheri in September 2016 announced the development of new long-range attack drones with the capability of precision bombing which was being shared with Russia.

Drones became a technology that Iranian engineers could develop locally as external markets closed due to sanctions or high prices.

On 29 July 2021 US sanctions were targeted at Iran's weapons program. While the US has previously sanctioned Iran's missile programs, the new penalties will target groups that supply parts for drones and missiles to Iran.

Also on 29 July 2021, a delta-wing drone, similar to unmanned "kamikaze" drones developed for the Islamic Revolutionary Guard Corps, flew into the pilothouse of the Merchant tanker Mercer Street in an incident known to Wikipedia's as the July 2021 Gulf of Oman incident. It was reported that two crewmembers (a Romanian and UK national assigned to security) were killed. Later tests indicated that the UAV had been rigged to cause injury using a Nitrate-based explosive, RDX.

In October 2021 Iran unveiled its new Kaman 22 (UAV), which seems to be modeled on the U.S.-made MQ-1 Predator and with other features from the more advanced MQ-9 Reaper. The aircraft is also reminiscent of the Chinese CH-5 drone.

List of Iranian military UAVs

This list is largely courtesy of globalsecurity.org. Iran has several organizations that manufacture drones, amongst which are: Qods Aviation Industry Company, IAMCO and Shahed Aviation Industries.
 Ababeel UAV (swallow) Ababil-2 Ababeel-3 Ababeel-B Ababeel-S Ababeel-T
 Arash UAV / Arash-2
 Baaz UAV (falcon)
 Chabokpar UAV (light wing)
 Fotros UAV
 Hadaf-3000 (endeavor)
 Hamaseh UAV (epic) 
 Kaman-12
 Kaman 22
 Karrar UAV
 Kian UAV / Kian-2
 Maine-Pakh-e-Faza 2
 Mohajer [Migrant]
 Mohajer-2 (migrant)
 Mohajer-3 (Dorna)
 Mohajer-4 (Hodhod)
 Mohajer-6
 Naseh UAV
 Raad 85 UAV
 Saegheh UAV (Thunderbolt)
 Sarir UAV (meaning "Throne")
 Sejil UAV
 Shahed 121 
 Shahed 129
 Shahed 131
 Shahed 136
 Shahed 149 Gaza 
 Shaheen UAV (hawk)
 Simorgh UAV / Simorq / Simurgh
 Talash UAV / Tallash I (Endeavor) / Tallash II / Talash 2
 Tizpar UAV (speed-flier)
 Toofan UAV (tempest)
 Yasir UAV (expedient)

References

 

 

Unmanned military aircraft of Iran
Iranian military aircraft
Aircraft manufactured in Iran
Islamic Republic of Iran Air Force
Post–Cold War military equipment of Iran
Unmanned aerial vehicles of Iran